The 1987 Dutch TT was the seventh round of the 1987 Grand Prix motorcycle racing season. It took place on the weekend of 22–27 June 1987 at the TT Circuit Assen located in Assen, Netherlands.

Classification

500 cc

References

Dutch TT
Dutch
Tourist Trophy